Eyvazlı is a village in the Aghdam District of Azerbaijan. The village forms part of the municipality of Guzanly.

References 

Populated places in Aghdam District